Belize City Airport can refer to:
Sir Barry Bowen Municipal Airport (formerly Belize City Municipal Airport)
Philip S. W. Goldson International Airport